The IMOCA 60 Class yacht PRB 3 was designed by Farr Yacht Design and launched in September 2006 after being assembled by CDK Technologies based in Lorient, France. The boat is a sistership to Foncia

Racing results

Timeline

PRB (3)

Akena Vérandas (3)

Initiatives-Cœur (2)

References 

2000s sailing yachts
Sailing yachts designed by Farr Yacht Design
Sailboat types built by CDK Technologies
Vendée Globe boats
IMOCA 60